Shark! (also known as Caine and Man-Eater) is a 1969 Mexican-American action film directed by Samuel Fuller and starring Burt Reynolds and Silvia Pinal.

Plot
Caine, a gunrunner, becomes stranded in a small port on the Red Sea. While there, he meets an attractive woman, Anna, who propositions him to dive into shark-infested waters off the coast. Though she alleges the purpose of the dive is scientific research, Caine eventually realizes that the woman and her partner are actually treasure hunters, and sees an opportunity to utilize the riches from the wreck they hope to raid to compensate for the earlier loss of his cargo.

Cast
 Burt Reynolds as Caine
 Arthur Kennedy as Doc
 Barry Sullivan as Professor Dan Mallare
 Silvia Pinal as Anna
 Francisco Reiguera as Yusef (credited as Francisco Reyguera)
 Enrique Lucero as Inspector Barok
 Manuel Alvarado as Latalla
 Carlos Barry as Runt

Production

Development
The film was based on the novel His Bones are Coral by Victor Canning. This was serialized in 1954 and published in 1955. The original screenplay was written by Ken Hughes.

In July 1966 it was announced Gaumont Pictures would make a film from the novel, directed by Byron Haskin, starring George Montgomery and produced by Mark Cooper. It was to be called Twist of the Knife and to be filmed in Mexico in July. Filming did not proceed.

Sam Fuller
In April 1967 it was announced Twist of the Knife would be produced by Skip Steloff for Calderon-Stell and directed by Sam Fuller, his first film since The Naked Kiss. The cast would include Burt Reynolds, Arthur Kennedy and Barry Sullivan.

The film was to be the first in a series of co productions between Skip Steloff, Marc Cooper's Heritage Productions, and Jose Luis Calderon's Cinemtographia Calderon.

When Sam Fuller joined the project, he rewrote the script and retitled it Caine. He shared writing credit with John Kingsbridge.

Fuller later said "I liked the idea of making a story where, for once, the hero is really the heavy, the heavy is the girl, there's another heavy, and you find out in the end they're all heavies."

He elaborated, saying he liked "doing a story about four amoral characters... to show not only a double cross on a double cross but when we think we know who the heavy is, we find out the real heavy behind it all is the girl... I have the hero not only allow her to die, but he shrugs it off. I thought that was exciting... I had such fun because I went beyond the average switch of revealing the villain. I also didn't have the guy just let the girl go to jail; he lets her be eaten by sharks."

Even before filming began, the producers announced they had signed Fuller to a four-picture deal, including a sequel to Caine.

Shooting
Filming took place for nine weeks in 1967, in Manzanillo, Mexico, which stood in for the Sudan.

During production, one of the film's stuntmen, Jose Marco, was attacked and killed on camera by a great white shark that broke through protective netting. The attack was captured on film and prompted a photo spread in Life magazine. The title was changed to Shark!  to cash in on the controversy.

Post-production
Fuller supervised editing in Mexico City for four weeks. His cut was later re-edited by Herbert L. Strock without Fuller's approval. When he finally saw the version that was released to theaters, he said he thought it was "terrible. I told them I wanted to restore my original cut. They said they didn't know if they could get it from Mexico."

Fuller demanded the producers take his name off it. The producers refused.

Release

Critical reception
The New York Times thought the film "still suggests the imagination of" Fuller.

Re-releases
The film was re-released by Hallmark in 1975 as Man-Eater to cash in on the success of Jaws. Advertising focused on the death of the stuntman in the film.

The Los Angeles Times called this version "threadbare".

See also
 List of American films of 1969

References

Notes

External links

Richard Brody on the 1969 film at The New Yorker

1969 films
1969 adventure films
American action films
American independent films
English-language Mexican films
Mexican action films
Troma Entertainment films
Films directed by Samuel Fuller
Films based on British novels
Films set in Sudan
Films shot in Mexico
Films about shark attacks
Treasure hunt films
Underwater action films
1960s English-language films
1960s American films
1960s Mexican films